Lukačević is a Serbian and Croatian surname, a patronymic derived from Lukač.

The slava (Orthodox patron saint veneration) of Lukačević families is Alypius the Stylite. In Podgorica, bearers of the surname are mainly Orthodox, while other are Muslims. These are all related to the Lukačević families in Berislavci and Vranje.

Notable people
 Vojislav Lukačević (1908–1945), Chetnik
 Ivan Lukačević (1946–2003), Yugoslav footballer
 Ivan Lukačević (soldier)
 Josip Lukačević (born 1983), Bosnian footballer
 Stevan Lukačević (1860–1932), Montenegrin politician

References

Serbian surnames
Croatian surnames